Disaster Peak is a summit in the U.S. state of Nevada. The summit is located in the Trout Creek Mountains.

Disaster Peak was named after an 1864  confrontation between prospectors and the Paiutes, resulting in the deaths of G. W. Dodge, J. W. Burton and two others.

References

Mountains of Humboldt County, Nevada